Herpetopoma mariae is a species of marine gastropod mollusc in the family Chilodontidae.

Distribution 
New Zealand.

Original description 
Herpetopoma mariae was originally discovered and described by Harold John Finlay in 1930. Finlay's original text (the type description) reads as follows:

References
This article incorporates public domain text coming from New Zealand from reference.

mariae
Gastropods described in 1930
Taxa named by Harold John Finlay